Abbas Ansarifard (25 April 1956 – 8 September 2021) was an Iranian football administrator who was chairman of multisport club Persepolis Athletic and Cultural Club between 1990 and 1993, January 2001–October 2001 and again briefly 2009. He was brother of Mohammad Hassan Ansarifard, a former player and chairman of Persepolis.

He died of COVID-19 on 8 September 2021.

References 

Iranian football chairmen and investors
1956 births
2021 deaths
Deaths from the COVID-19 pandemic in Iran